Wolverhampton Wolves are a British speedway team based in Wolverhampton, England. They are sponsored by Parry's International Travel, and signed a deal with owner Dave Parry (previous speedway rider for the Wolverhampton Wolves) for the 2008 season onwards. The team is managed by Peter Adams and the promoter of the club is Chris Van Straaten.

History

1928–1960
The club was founded in 1928 racing at Monmore Green Stadium, and after a brief flirtation with speedway, saw its last pre-war meeting in 1930. It was 20 years later that the sport returned to the town.

During 1948 and the post-war optimism, record crowds were attending speedway events up and down the country. With towns keen to cash in on the boom, Wolverhampton's stadium owners applied to the local council for a track to be re-built at the original site. Australian Arthur Simcock set the ball rolling and was granted permission to promote speedway in Wolverhampton and finally his dream came true on 14 October 1950. The first to test the new track were some visiting Norwich riders, en route to a meeting. They declared themselves satisfied. Officially once again founded in 1951, known as the Wolverhampton Wasps, the racing keen fans saw a Wolverhampton team defeat Sheffield 58-26 (old 14-heat formula). With all parties happy, Wolverhampton were admitted into Division Three of the National League of the same year.

However the winter of 1952/3 was a tumultuous one for speedway in the Black Country. Cradley Heath had endured a tough season in the Second Division, but meanwhile Wolverhampton had enjoyed a solid Third Division campaign. Due to the events at Cradley, a merger took place between the two promotions and saw a new formed team racing in the Second Division at Monmore Green. (Dudley Wood closed and didn't hear the roar of speedway bikes until 1959). Wolverhampton were pleased with this 'promotion' and saw the only meeting where supporters had been 'locked out'. It was reported 12,000 fans turned up with many more scaling the walls. The first meeting against Stoke in their new form saw the Potters demolished 52-32.

This was however short lived and the side was thumped home and away in the early part of the 1954 season. A decision was made by the promotion and in early May of the same year, Wolverhampton closed its doors to speedway.

1961–1990
It wasn't until 1961 when the sport returned to the venue again. In 1963, the team secured their first silverware, winning the 1963 Provincial Speedway League.

Since 1965 Wolverhampton have competed in the top tier of British speedway with the exception of 1981 (second tier) and 1982/3 (inactive).

1991–2000
They won their first highest league title (and second ever title) in 1991, after winning the 1991 British League season. They were led by their American star Sam Ermolenko, who became the first rider to push Hans Nielsen from the top of the averages after eight consecutive years at the top. The Wolves team relied on two more American riders, Ronnie Correy and Sam's younger brother Charles Ermolenko, in addition to Englishman Graham Jones to seal the title from Bradford. The Wolves won the title for the second time in six years in 1996, with American Ronnie Correy being the sole survivor of the 1991 winning team. In a strange coincidence a new set of two brothers helped Wolves win the title, back in 1991 it was the Ermolenko brothers but now it was the Swedish Karlsson brothers. Peter Karlsson and Mikael Karlsson both scored heavily and ended the season with averages around the 10 mark.

2001–2009
The Wolverhampton Wolves were the Sky Sports Elite League champions in 2002. Although they only finished 2nd in the regular season table they defeated Eastbourne Eagles in the play off final. It was Wolves third title success in 11 years and the Swedish Karlsson brothers, Peter and Mikael were once again integral to the Wolves team throughout the season. After a play off final loss in 2004 they regained the champion status in the 2009 season, beating the Swindon Robins 95-90 on aggregate in the 2009 play-offs.

2010–2019
On 10 August 2015 Swindon Robins rider Darcy Ward broke the track record time held by Tai Woffinden. Darcy's new record time 53.45 seconds. Then on 29 August 2016 Niels-Kristian Iversen broke the track record again with a time of 52.69 seconds. The team became UK champions for the fifth time in 2016, beating the top of the table finishing Belle Vue Aces. After winning by an 18-point margin at home in the first leg by beating the Belle Vue Aces 54-36, the second leg was a win for Belle Vue of 50-42, meaning victory for the Wolves by a 10-point margin with the aggregate scores 96-86.

2020–present
The team finished 2nd and 4th respectively in 2021 and 2022 but were beaten in the play offs.

Season summary

Riders previous seasons 

1975 team

2004 team

2005 team

2006 team

2007 team

 (No.8)
Also Rode:

2008 team

 (No.8)
Also Rode:

2009 team

 ‡
 ‡
 (No.8)
Also Rode:
 (No.8) †

‡ 
† 

2010 team

 AS

 ‡
 ‡

‡

‡ 
AS 

2011 team

2012 team

2013 team

2014 team

2015 team

2016 team

2017 team

2018 team

2019 team

 (Cover for Jacob Thorssell)

2021 team

2022 team

 (C)

 (Rising Star)
 (Number 8)

Notable riders

Olympique

Wolves host the Olympique annually.

Individual Honours
World Championship
 Ole Olsen (1971, 1975)
 Sam Ermolenko (1993)
 Tai Woffinden (2013, 2015)

World Under-21 Championship
 Mikael Karlsson (1994)
 Piotr Pawlicki Jr. (2014)

Long Track World Championship
 Ole Olsen (1973)

British Speedway Championship
 Tai Woffinden (2013, 2014, 2015)

British League Riders' Championship
 Ole Olsen (1972)
 Sam Ermolenko (1991, 1994)

Elite League Riders' Championship
 Fredrik Lindgren (2010, 2016)

Australian Championship
 Jim Airey (1968)
 Sam Masters (2017)

Danish Championship'
 Ole Olsen (1970, 1971, 1972, 1973, 1975)

United States Championship
 Sam Ermolenko (1993, 1994)
 Billy Hamill (2007)

British Under 21 Championship
 Simon Stead (2003)
 Joe Haines (2010)

British Under 19 Championship
 Max Clegg (2016)

South Australian Championship
 Mark Fiora (1984)

References

Speedway Elite League teams
Sport in Wolverhampton